Irina Petrovna Rusanova (22 April 1929 – 22 October 1998) was a Russian archaeologist and member of the Institute of Archaeology of the Russian Academy of Sciences. Her husband was Ukrainian archaeologist Boris Timoshchuk.

Publications
 Kurgany polân X-XII vv, 1966
 Slavjanskie drevnosti VI - IX vv. meždu Dneprom i zapadnym Bugom, 1966
 Drevnerusskoe Podnestrovʹe : Istoriko-kraevedcheskie ocherki, 1981
 Kodyn - slavânskie poseleniâ V-VIII vv. na r. Prut, 1984
 Kulʹtura i iskusstvo srednevekovogo goroda, 1984
 Âzyčeskie svâtiliŝa drevnih slavân : rossijskaâ predistoriâ, 1993
 Slavâne i ih sosedi v konce I tysâčeletiâ do n.è.-pervoj polovine I tysâčeletiâ n.è., 1993
 Jazyceskie svjatilisca drevnich slavjan, 1993
 Istoki slavjanskogo jazyčestva : kul'tovye sooruženija Central'noj i Vostočnoj Evropy v I tys. do n.ė. - I tys. n.ė, 2002
 I︠A︡zycheskie svi︠a︡tilishcha drevnikh slavi︠a︡n, 2007

References

1929 births
1998 deaths
Archaeologists from Moscow
Soviet archaeologists
Russian women archaeologists
Slavists
Moscow State University alumni
20th-century Russian non-fiction writers
20th-century Russian women writers
20th-century archaeologists
Members of the Russian Academy of Sciences